As Somozas is a municipality in the province of A Coruña in the autonomous community of Galicia in northwestern Spain. It belongs to the comarca of Ferrol.
 

Municipalities in the Province of A Coruña